Hugh Lennox Ross (February 23, 1937 in Montreal – November 20, 2017 in Oakland, California) was a championship contract bridge player. Although a Canadian citizen, he played on American bridge teams.  

Ross was born and raised in Montreal, Quebec, Canada and was a graduate of McGill University.
Ross was inducted into the ACBL Hall of Fame in 2002.

Bridge accomplishments

Honors

 ACBL Hall of Fame, 2002

Wins

 Bermuda Bowl (3) 1976, 1985, 1987 
 North American Bridge Championships (19)
 Nail Life Master Open Pairs (2) 1990, 1991 
 Grand National Teams (7) 1982, 1983, 1985, 1987, 1993, 1996, 2003 
 Jacoby Open Swiss Teams (1) 1995 
 Vanderbilt (2) 1984, 1987 
 Marcus Cup (1) 1963 
 Reisinger (6) 1968, 1974, 1975, 1981, 1985, 1986

Runners-up

 Bermuda Bowl (2) 1977, 1989 
 Rosenblum Cup (1) 1982 
 North American Bridge Championships
 von Zedtwitz Life Master Pairs (1) 1992 
 North American Pairs (1) 1985 
 Grand National Teams (1) 2001 
 Jacoby Open Swiss Teams (1) 1994 
 Keohane North American Swiss Teams (1) 1996 
 Chicago Mixed Board-a-Match (1) 1986 
 Reisinger (2) 1966, 1983

References

External links
 
 

1937 births
2017 deaths
American contract bridge players
Canadian contract bridge players
Bermuda Bowl players
McGill University alumni
Sportspeople from Montreal
Sportspeople from Oakland, California
Canadian emigrants to the United States